The Type DT4 is a four-car electric multiple unit (EMU) train type operated by the Hamburger Hochbahn AG on the Hamburg U-Bahn system since 1988.

Formation
Every DT4 train consists of four cars, which are formed as two articulated half-sets with two cars each. The cars don't have gangways, but feature windows in the inner car ends.

Interior
The interior consists of transverse seating bays. Widescreen passenger information displays are to be fitted to the whole DT4 fleet, with works scheduled to be completed in 2022.

Technical specifications
The trains have steel car bodies and a three-phase propulsion system. Thyristor inverters are used in the DT4.1 and DT4.2 trains, and the DT4.3 through DT4.5 trains use GTO-pulse inverters. The DT4.56 and DT4.6 trains use IGBT-pulse inverters.

Each four-car set has four powered bogies and two non-motored jacobs bogies. The powered bogies are equipped with water cooled three-phase asynchronous motors.

History
The development of the DT4 began in 1986, and the first unit was completed on May 30, 1988. Passenger service began on October 17 of the same year.

The DT4 trains are being refurbished since 2011. They receive a newer interior appearance, similar to the interior of the DT5 trains. One car of set 140 was refurbished for testing purposes in summer 2010. Regular refurbishment started in 2011.

References

External links

 Hochbahn fleet information 

Hamburg U-Bahn
Electric multiple units of Germany
750 V DC multiple units
ABB multiple units